Salha Hamadin is a Palestinian writer of the Jahalin Bedouin tribe. She lives in the West Bank.

In 2012, when she was 14 years old, her story Hantush won the Hans Christian Andersen Award.

Personal life 
Hamadin is a Jahalin Bedouin living in Wadi Abu Hindi, in Area C of the West Bank.

She is the daughter of Souleiman, a prisoner in Israel.

Writing 
In 2012, when she was 14 year old, Hamadin wrote Hantush; a story about a girl called Salha who lives in the occupied West Bank and whose family's home is demolished by a military bulldozer.  Salha asks her pet lamb Hantush take her away from Palestine. The lamb takes Salha to Spain where she meets football player Lionel Messi. The story won the Hans Christian Andersen -  Fairy Tale Bay competition.

She wrote the story after encouragement at a workshop delivered by Italian organisation Vento Di Terra and the Tamer Institute for Community Education.

References 

Bedouins
21st-century Palestinian women writers
Hans Christian Andersen Award for Writing winners
People from the West Bank
Living people
Year of birth missing (living people)